Dolsko is a settlement in Slovenia.

Dolsko may also refer to the following places in Poland:
Dolsko, Pomeranian Voivodeship (north Poland)
Dolsko, West Pomeranian Voivodeship (north-west Poland)